Phyllosticta solitaria is a fungal plant pathogen infecting apples.

References

External links
USDA ARS Fungal Database

Fungal tree pathogens and diseases
Apple tree diseases
solitaria
Fungi described in 1895